Susanne Peter Maselle is a Tanzanian CHADEMA politician and Special Seats Member of Parliament since 2015. She was a member of the budget committee from 2015 to 2018. She has made a total of 10 contributions in the parliament and has asked 8 primary questions and 5 supplementary questions primarily concerning employment and mineral resources.

References

Living people
Chadema MPs
Tanzanian MPs 2010–2015
Year of birth missing (living people)